Pemphigus obesinymphae is a species of gall-forming aphid. It creates galls on the leaves of Populus fremontii.  The species is the only North American aphid known to have soldiers, first instar nymphs that defend the colony.

References

Eriosomatinae
Hemiptera of North America
Insects described in 1994

Gall-inducing insects